Martin Guldan (born 3 September 1990) is a Slovak football striker who currently plays for SC Volksbank Marchegg.

In February 2008, he was on trial in U.S. Lecce.

References

External links
FC Spartak profile 

1990 births
Living people
Sportspeople from Trnava
Association football forwards
Slovak footballers
FC Spartak Trnava players
Slovak Super Liga players